Aşağıkızılkale is a neighbourhood in the Köprüköy District of Erzurum Province in Turkey.

References

Villages in Köprüköy District